Nuwaragam Palatha East Divisional Secretariat is a  Divisional Secretariat  of Anuradhapura District, of North Central Province, Sri Lanka.

References
 Divisional Secretariats Portal

Divisional Secretariats of Anuradhapura District